Howard W. Riley (2 May 1879 in East Orange, New Jersey – 15 Aug 1971 in Ithaca, New York) was the first head of what is now the Cornell University Department of Biological and Environmental Engineering, appointed in 1907.   He served as head of the department until his retirement in 1944.  Riley-Robb Hall, where the department now resides, is named after him.

Notes and references

External links
Riley-Robb Hall Facility Information

Cornell University faculty
1879 births
1971 deaths